Love It or List It is a television franchise of television programs created by Maria Armstrong and Catherine Fogarty. Each series follows a format, with a current homeowning couple or family to deciding between keeping their newly renovated current home (known on the show as "Love It") or buying a new home and selling their current one (known on the show as "List It").

International versions

See also
Flip or Flop (franchise)
Property Brothers (franchise)

References

Love It or List It
Television franchises